Raotince is a village located about 10 miles (14 km) northeast from the city of Tetovo in Jegunovce Municipality, North Macedonia.

History
West of present-day Raotince is the Late Antiquity archaeological site Arbino, a former village from which many archaeological remains have been excavated. Its etymological formation stems from the old South Slavic ethnonym for Albanians, Arban.

Demographics
According to the 2002 census, the village had a total of 565 inhabitants. Ethnic groups in the village include:
Macedonians: 559
Albanians: 4
Serbs: 1
others: 1

References

Villages in Jegunovce Municipality